Krishan Niranjan Singh (1 September 1908 – 31 January 2000), known as K. N. Singh in Indian cinema, was a prominent villain and character actor. He appeared in over 200 Hindi films over a long career stretching from 1936 to the late 1980s.

Career

Early years (1908–1936)
The son of Chandi Prasad Singh, an erstwhile Indian prince and a prominent criminal lawyer, K.N. Singh was a sportsman who once dreamt of being in the army. Born in Dehradun, Singh was expected to follow in the footsteps of his father and become a lawyer. However, his father's skillful defence, which saved an obviously guilty man from the gallows, turned him away from the profession.

Turning his energy to sports, K.N. Singh came to excel in the javelin throw and the shot put. He was selected to represent India in the 1936 Berlin Olympics before circumstances compelled him to go to Calcutta to attend on his ailing sister. There he met his family friend Prithviraj Kapoor, who introduced him to director Debaki Bose, who offered him a debut role in his film Sunehra Sansar (1936).

Popular villain (1936 to late 1960s)
K.N. Singh enjoyed limited success until the release of Baghban (1938), in which he played the antagonist. Baghban was a golden jubilee hit, establishing Singh as one of the leading villains of the era.

Through the 1940s and 1950s, Singh appeared in several iconic movies of the era, including Sikandar (1941), Jwar Bhata (1944) (Dilip Kumar's film debut), Humayun (1945), Awara (1951), Jaal (1952), CID (1956), Howrah Bridge (1958), Chalti Ka Naam Gaadi (1958), Amrapali (1966) and An Evening in Paris (1967).

As opposed to playing angry mobsters, he mostly played a white collared gentleman villain, dressed in a fine suit and smoking a pipe, with a calm cold delivery.

His suave style, baritone voice and menacing eyes became legendary – so much so that on one occasion (in his own words) "Even off-screen I was a bad man. One day on my way back from shooting, I had to deliver an envelope at an address given to me by my friend. I pressed the doorbell and, from the moving curtains, I could see a woman hurrying to open the door. When she saw me standing in front of her, she screamed out in fright and ran inside leaving the door open."

As an actor, Singh's thirst for learning was legendary. For example, he studied the style and mannerisms of carriage riders to prepare for the role of a horse carriage driver in Inspector (1956).

Later years (1970 to late 1980s)
Singh played prominent roles in movies such as Jhoota Kahin Ka (1970), Haathi Mere Saathi (1971) and Mere Jeevan Saathi (1972). His last prominent role was in the 1973 film Loafer.

With advancing years, Singh became less active, particularly from the mid 1970s onwards. Many of his roles from the late 1970s onwards were mere cameo appearances, arranged with the sole purpose of ensuring that actors turned up on time – such was his stature that actors would never turn up late when K.N. Singh was on the set. His last appearance was in Woh Din Aayega (1986).

Personal life
Singh was the eldest among 6 siblings: a sister and five brothers. Because he was unable to have any children naturally, he adopted Pushkar, the son of his brother Bikram (who was once the editor of Filmfare magazine) as their son.

Singh became completely blind in his last years. He died in Mumbai on 31 January 2000 aged 91 and was survived by his adopted son Pushkar, who is a producer of television serials.

Selected filmography 

 Sonar Sansar (1936)
 Sunehra Sansar (1936)
 Karodpati (1936)
 Mukti (1937) as Guest at party of Chitra's father
 Bidyapati (1937)
 Sitara (1938)
 Nirala Hindustan (1938)
 Baghban (1938) as Ranjit
 Thokar (1939) as Doctor
 Aap Ki Marzi (1939)
 Sikandar (1941) as Raja Ambhi (Maharaja Amphis)
 Phir Milenge (1942)
 Ek Raat (1942)
 Shahenshah Akbar (1943)
 Prithvi Vallabh (1943) as Bhillam
 Prarthana (1943) as Doctor
 Taqdeer (1943)
 Maharathi Karna (1944) as Duryodhan
 Jwar Bhata (1944)
 Draupadi (1944)
 Ratnavali (1945)
 Mazdoor (1945)
 Laila Majnu (1945)
 Humayun (1945) as Jai Singh
 Room No. 9 (1946)
 Rangbhoomi (1946)
 Zanjeer (1947)
 Parwana (1947) as Kishan
 Chalte Chalte (1947)
 Barsaat (1949) as Bholu
 Singaar (1949) as Kishan's Father
 Paras (1949)
 Nirdosh (1950)
 Banwra (1950)
 Sazaa (1951) as Major Dhurjan Singh
 Awara (1951) as Jagga
 Sanam (1951) as Advocate-Sadhna's Father
 Saagar (1951)
 Hulchul (1951) as Asha's brother
 Baazi (1951) as Rajani's Father
 Parbat (1952) as Parbat's obsessive lover
 Jaal (1952) as Carlo
 Insaan (1952)
 Ghungroo (1952)
 Do Raha (1952)
 Aandhiyan (1952) as Kuber Das
 Armaan (1953)
 Shahenshah (1953)
 Shikast (1953) as Madho
 Baaz (1953) as General Barborosa
 Sangham (1954)
 Ehsan (1954)
 Badshah (1954)
 Angarey (1954) as Dozila
 Marine Drive (1955) as Khanna
 Milap (1955) as Seth Karamchand
 House No. 44 (1955) as Captain
 C.I.D. (1956) as Superintendent of Police
 Zindagi Ke Mele (1956)
 Funtoosh (1956) as Karodi Lal
 Beti (1957)
 Inspector (1957) as Badri Prasad
 Ustad (1957)
 Mera Salaam (1957)
 Hill Station (1957)
 Bade Sarkar (1957) as Thakur Maan Singh
 Chandan (1958)
 Chalti Ka Naam Gaadi (1958) as Raja Hardayal Singh
 Taxi Stand (1958)
 Kabhi Andhera Kabhi Ujala (1958)
 Howrah Bridge (1958) as Pyarelal
 Detective (1958) as Gonsalves
 Chaubees Ghante (1958)
 Chaalbaaz (1958)
 Keechak Vadha (1959)
 Kali Topi Lal Rumal (1959)
 Forty Days (1959) as Bholanath
 Bank Manager (1959) as Ranjeet
 Nache Nagin Baje Been (1960)
 Singapore (1960) as Shivdas 
 Road No. 303 (1960)
 Mehlon Ke Khwab (1960) as Motilal / CID Police Inspector
 Manzil (1960) as Mr. Mehta
 Gambler (1960)
 Chhabili (1960)
 Barsaat Ki Raat (1960) as Police Commissioner Khan Bahadur
 Miss Chalbaaz (1961)
 Senapati (1961)
 Sapne Suhane (1961) as Baldev
 Salaam Memsaab (1961)
 Reshmi Rumal (1961) as Rai Saheb
 Passport (1961) as Shamsher Singh / Shyamlal
 Opera House (1961) as Danial
 Krorepati (1961) as Diwan Hukumat Rai
 Dark Street (1961)
 Hong Kong (1962)
 Isi Ka Naam Duniya Hai (1962) as Varma
 Vallah Kya Baat Hai (1962) as Firoz Singh
 Soorat Aur Seerat (1962)
 Raaz Ki Baat (1962) as Police Commissioner Singh
 Naqli Nawab (1962) as Nawab Sharafat Ali
 Shikari (1963) as Dr. Cyclops
 Lado Rani (1963) Punjabi Movie 
 Woh Kaun Thi? (1964) as Dr. Singh
 Dulha Dulhan (1964) as Thakur Dharam Singh
 Rustom-E-Hind (1965)
 Raaka (1965) as Vishal
 Faraar (1965) as Public Prosecutor
 Ek Saal Pehle (1965)
 Bombay Race Course (1965)
 Mera Saaya (1966) as Prosecuting Lawyer
 Street Singer (1966)
 Amrapali (1966) as Badbadhra Singh
 Teesri Manzil (1966)
 Raat Aur Din (1967) as Varuna's Father
 Johar in Bombay (1967)
 An Evening in Paris (1967) as Jack
 Dil Aur Mohabbat (1968) as Singh
 Teri Talash Mein (1968) (uncredited)
 Spy in Rome (1968) as Dr. Chang
 Mere Huzoor (1968) as Hakim
 Ek Phool Ek Bhool (1968) as Dr. Rakesh's Father
 Sapna (1969)
 Simla Road (1969)
 Shart (1969) as Singh
 Nateeja (1969) as Boss
 Jigri Dost (1969) as Chairman Neelkanth
 The Revenger (1970)
 Tarzan 303 (1970)
 Suhana Safar (1970) as Dr. Singh
 Mangu Dada (1970)
 Dagabaaz (1970)
 Pagla Kahin Ka (1970) as Max
 Himmat (1970) as Inspector Mathur
 Ehsan (1970) as Dinanath / Vishwanath Prasad
 Meeting  (1970) as Mahendranath
 Haathi Mere Saathi (1971) as Sarwan Kumar
 Pyar Ki Kahani (1971) as Ram's boss
 Jaane-Anjaane (1971) as Poonamchand
 Reshma and Shera (1971) as Chowdhary
 Hum Tum Aur Woh (1971) as Advocate (Vakil Saheb)
 Dushmun (1971) as Public Prosecutor Saxena
 Bansi Birju (1972)
 Mere Jeevan Saathi (1972) as Gobindram (Prakash's dad)
 Do Chor (1972) as Tribhuvan Singh
 Do Bachche Dus Haath (1972) as Girdhari
 Loafer (1973) as Mr. Singh 'Uncle'
 Kachhe Dhaage (1973) as Sona's father
 Sabak (1973) as Ajit
 Keemat (1973) as Chief of Secret Services
 Hanste Zakhm (1973) as Chanda's patron
 Daaman Aur Aag (1973) as Mr. Singh
 Sagina (1974) as Factory Owner
 Majboor (1974) as Prosecuting Attorney
 Vachan (1974)
 Jeevan Rekha (1974)
 Hamrahi (1974) as Boss V.K.
 Badhti Ka Naam Dadhi (1974) as Khadak Singh
 Romeo in Sikkim (1975)
 Dimple (1975)
 Rafoo Chakkar (1975) as #3 Duo
 Qaid (1975) as Dr. Trivedi
 Kala Sona (1975) as Police Commissioner
 Prem Kahani (1975) as Rai Bahadur Shrikant Sinha
 Meera Shyam (1976)
 Harfan Maulaa (1976) as Police Inspector
 Adalat (1976) as Singh
 Mamta (1977)
 Jadu Tona (1977)
 Saheb Bahadur (1977) as Police Supdt. Pasupathi
 Mera Vachan Geeta Ki Kasam (1977) as Khan Bahadur
 Agent Vinod (1977) as Chief of Agent Vinod
 Guru Ho Jaa Shuru (1979) as CBI Chief (uncredited)
 Zulm Ki Pukar (1979)
 Do Premee (1980) as Shivlal / Mahayogi
 Dostana (1980) as Judge
 Farz Aur Pyar (1981) as Senior Air Force Officer
 Shradhanjali (1981) as Amit's Diwanji
 Kaalia (1981) as Convict
 Professor Pyarelal (1981)
 Teri Maang Sitaron Se Bhar Doon (1982) as Nataraj Seth
 Bekhabar (1983)
 Sardaar (1984) as Advocate Mathur
 The Gold Medal (1984) as Singh
 Woh Din Aayega (1987) as Police Commissioner hukumat
 Hukumat (1987) as DBDN's Friend
 Soorma Bhopali (1988)
 Laat Saab (1992) as K.N. Singh
 Laila (1994 film) (1994)
 Daanveer'' (1996) (final film role)

References

External links
 
 Sophisticated villain of Hindi films
 K.N. Singh

Indian male film actors
1908 births
2000 deaths
Male actors in Hindi cinema
20th-century Indian male actors
Male actors from Dehradun